Opisthotropis is a genus of snakes in the family Colubridae. The genus is endemic to Southeast Asia and South China.

Species
The genus Opisthotropis contains the following 25 species which are recognized as being valid, listed alphabetically by scientific name.
Opisthotropis alcalai  – Gary's mountain keelback
Opisthotropis andersonii  – Anderson's stream snake
Opisthotropis atra 
Opisthotropis cheni 
Opisthotropis cucae  (found in Kontum, Vietnam) – Cuc's mountain snake
Opisthotropis daovantieni  – Tien's mountain stream snake
Opisthotropis durandi  – Durand's mountain stream snake
Opisthotropis guangxiensis  – Guangxi mountain keelback
Opisthotropis haihaensis  – Hai Ha mountain stream keelback
Opisthotropis hungtai  –  Hung-Ta Chang's mountain keelback
Opisthotropis jacobi  – Chapa mountain keelback
Opisthotropis kikuzatoi  – Kikuzato's brook snake
Opisthotropis kuatunensis  – Chinese mountain keelback
Opisthotropis lateralis  – Tonkin mountain keelback
Opisthotropis latouchii  – Sichuan mountain keelback
Opisthotropis laui  - Lau's mountain stream snake
Opisthotropis maculosa  – yellow-spotted mountain stream snake
Opisthotropis maxwelli  – Maxwell's mountain keelback
Opisthotropis rugosa  – Sumatran stream snake
Opisthotropis shenzhenensis  – Shenzhen mountain stream snake
Opisthotropis spenceri 
Opisthotropis tamdaoensis  
Opisthotropis typica  – olive mountain keelback
Opisthotropis voquyi  – Vo Quy's mountain stream keelback
Opisthotropis zhaoermii  – Zhao's mountain stream snake

Nota bene: A binomial authority in parentheses indicates that the species was originally described in a genus other than Opisthotropis.

References

Further reading
Günther A (1872). "Seventh Account of new Species of Snakes in the Collection of the British Museum". Annals and Magazine of Natural History, Fourth Series 9: 13–37. (Opisthotropis, new genus, p. 16).
Yang J-H, Wang Y-Y, Zhang B, Lau MW-N, Chou WH (2011). "Revision of the diagnostic characters of Opisthotropis maculosa Stuart and Chuaynkern, 2007 with notes on its distribution and variation, and a key to the genus Opisthotropis (Squamata: Natricidae)". Zootaxa 2785: 61–68.

 
Snake genera
Taxa named by Albert Günther
Taxonomy articles created by Polbot